Dóra Süle (born 20 September 1998) is a Hungarian footballer who plays as a midfielder for Női NB I club Győri ETO FC and the Hungary women's national team.

References

1998 births
Living people
Women's association football midfielders
Hungarian women's footballers
Hungary women's international footballers
Győri ETO FC players